Tymnes chrysis is a species of leaf beetle. It is found in North America. The species has been recorded from plants of the genus Robinia (commonly known as "locusts") or similar genera in the family Fabaceae.

References

Further reading

 

Eumolpinae
Articles created by Qbugbot
Beetles described in 1808
Taxa named by Guillaume-Antoine Olivier
Beetles of the United States